The Honolulu Rainbow Film Festival (HRFF) is an LGBT film festival held annually in Honolulu which began in 1989 as the Adam Baran Honolulu Gay and Lesbian Film Festival.

History
Businessman Jack Law founded the non-profit Honolulu Gay & Lesbian Cultural Foundation (HGLCF) in 1997 as an umbrella organization for the Adam Baran Honolulu Gay and Lesbian Film Festival, now known as the Honolulu Rainbow Film Festival (HRFF).

Prior to establishment of the non-profit, the film festival (started in 1989), originally donated proceeds of the festival to the Life Foundation, the state's main AIDS/HIV organization. Today, the HGLCF is a self-supporting non-profit 501(c)3, whose mission is to educate and raise awareness of the community-at-large about gay and lesbian culture, arts and lifestyle. HGLCF also works toward instilling a sense of pride and respect among the members of the Gay community, as well as to highlight the unique cosmopolitan ambiance of the city of Honolulu.

Films programmed at the HRFF have gone on to win Peabody and Emmy Awards, such as the documentary, Daddy & Papa. HRFF has worked with PBS Hawaiʻi to program LGBT content documentaries. In 2008, a pilot Neighbor Island Outreach in Hilo on the Big Island began.

Background
The success of the HRFF over the years is attributed to deep community involvement and great partners to help achieve its goals. For over two decades, the HRFF has been inspiring community and civic engagement through its programming and special events. The HRFF helps to engender mutual respect within society, supports a vital and sustainable economy and provides a unique, memorable and enriching experience.

See also
Film festivals in North and Central America
List of film festivals
List of LGBT film festivals

References

External links
Honolulu Gay and Lesbian Cultural Foundation website

1989 establishments in Hawaii
Film festivals in Hawaii
LGBT film festivals in the United States
LGBT in Hawaii
Film festivals established in 1989
Tourist attractions in Honolulu